State Road 167 (SR 167) is a State Road in the eastern section of the state of Indiana. The entire route is rural two-lane highway that passes through farmland and residential properties. SR 167 was originally introduced in the 1931 routed along its modern routing. The entire was paved by the mid-1960s.

Route description
SR 167 begins at an intersection between Walnut Street (SR 67) and Mississinewa Avenue, in the city of Albany in Delaware County. From there the road continues northeast on Mississinewa Avenue through a mix of residential neighborhoods and farmland for about  before leaving the city of Albany. After leaving Albany SR 167 enters unincorporated Delaware County, passing through rural farmland as a two-lane highway. The road enters Dunkirk following Main Street, passing through the downtown of the city. The street crosses a Norfolk Southern Railway track, before leaving downtown Dunkirk. North of downtown Main Street curves due north near the West Jay County Middle School and forms the border between Blackford and Jay Counties. The SR 167 designation ends at an intersection with SR 26 east of Hartford City, but the roadway continues north as a county road.

No segment of State Road 167 in Indiana is included in the National Highway System (NHS).  The NHS is a network of highways that are identified as being most important for the economy, mobility and defense of the nation. The highway is maintained by the Indiana Department of Transportation (INDOT) like all other state roads in the state. The department tracks the traffic volumes along all state roads as a part of its maintenance responsibilities using a metric called average annual daily traffic (AADT). This measurement is a calculation of the traffic level along a segment of roadway for any average day of the year. In 2013, the department's traffic surveys showed that on average, 4324 vehicles used the highway daily along Main Street on the south end of Dunkirk and 784 vehicles did so each day near the northern end of SR 167, the highest and lowest counts along the highway, respectively.

History
SR 167 was first designated in 1931. The original routing started in Albany and ran north through Dunkirk to SR 26 much as it does today. The entire road was either gravel or stone surface, until 1940 when the state highway commissioned desired to paved the road south of Dunkirk. This paving was completed by 1942. The segment of road north of Dunkirk was paved between 1962 and 1963.

Major intersections

References

External links

167
Transportation in Blackford County, Indiana
Transportation in Delaware County, Indiana
Transportation in Jay County, Indiana